Hinganghat is a city in Wardha district of the Indian state of Maharashtra.

Hinganghat is surrounded on two sides by the Wena River, which provides natural resources. National Highway 44 (old Name NH-7), a part of the North-South Corridor, passes through the city. Hinganghat is located in the fertile Wardha Valley; it was historically a center of the Indian cotton trade and a major centre for grains. The tehsil of Hinganghat comprises about 76 villages. The main language spoken in Hinganghat is Marathi. Hinganghat is the ninth biggest city in Vidharbha the region of Maharashtra and ranks 436 in India [According to the 2011 census].

Baba Amte, the social worker who helped people suffering from Leprosy, was born in Hinganghat. It hosts the largest Cotton mandi in Maharashtra state. Also, it has the tallest statue of lord Vithoba (52 ft) on the banks of river Wena.

History
Hinganghat is 1500 years old. The City was named Dandungram in the century 5 CE. Reign of Rani Prabhavati Gupta, the queen of the Vakataka Dynasty, was also here. The new name Hinganghat fall because of the availability of Hing (assafoetida) trees and ghats of the Vena river.
The Development of Hinganghat was followed by the British and the Municipal Council of Hinganghat which was established on 17 May 1873. The first water tank here was built in 1873. The Municipal Council's Hall was built in 1904. The first Election of the Municipal Council was held in the year 1927. The Wena Dam was created by Municipal Council. Presently, seven water tanks are available. The city was historically a major centre of cotton and soyabean oil. Presently, Hinganghat is the largest industrial hub in Wardha District and ranking 4th in the Nagpur Division. The Dal mills and oil mills are also available here.

Geography 
So, the Wena river flows throughout the year and helps the city face no drought. The Hinganghat APMC market ranks second in the Vidarbha region.

The city is a hub of India's cotton industry. There is also a soybean oil industry and numerous small to medium scale dal mills and oil mills in the vicinity of Hinganghat.Hinganghat is the largest industrial hub in Wardha District.

Demographics
In 2011, Hinganghat's population was 101,805. Males constituted 52% of the population.
Hinganghat's average literacy rate of 94% was higher than the Indian national average of 74%. The male literacy rate was 97% and the female literacy rate was 90%. According to the Times of India, Hinganghat has the highest literacy rate of any city in Maharashtra. Literacy data analysed by UNICEF for cities with populations of more than 100,000 puts Hinganghat at the top, with a literacy rate of 94.34%, followed by Wardha (94.05%), Panvel (93.98%) and Gondia (93.70%).

Religion

Bansilal Kochar developed the Jain temple in 1955. The decorations of the temple are made of glass. Islam is followed by around 6% of the population and the Jamia Masjid is located near the centre of the city.

In Hinganghat, Garba is worshipped in Mata Mandir, "a temple of Mata Devi". It is the most important place in Navratri in Hinganghat and the oldest temple in the city and the land space was donated by Ganpatro Sadashiv Mawle.

Transport

The Hinganghat railway station lies on the main Delhi to Chennai railway line. It is the major railway station in the region. Express services include the Navjeevan, Nandigram, Andman Express, AhilyaNagri express, Sevagram Express,  Dakshin, G.T., Raptisagar Expresses, Secunderabad Superfast express, Kazipet -Pune superfast express, MGR Chennai central-Jaipur superfast express, Gomtisagar Express,  Korba superfast express, Trivandrum Central Expresses, Anandwan Superfast express, Yesvantpur Superfast express, Jaipur-Mysuru express, Coimbatore-Jaipur Superfast Express
And Many Trains halt at this Station.  
The nearest airport is Dr. Babasaheb Ambedkar International Airport, Nagpur which is 70 km away from the city centre. National Highway 44 passes through Hinganghat.

Agriculture Research Centre
The agriculture research station, Kutki is situated in Hinganghat on Pandharakwada road, which is national highway no. 44. The distance of this research station from the Hinganghat bus stop is 9 km away while from the Hinganghat railway station it is 7 km. Kutki is the nearby village of this station which is only half km away from this station. While going to Hinganghat from Wardha there is a need not to go to Hinganghat to approach this station, but by turning right before of Hinganghat on Pandhrkawada road the station is just 4 km away. A Wana river is there 1.5 km away from the station. By lift irrigation system the water is used for 33.52 Ha area of this station. More irrigation efforts are undergoing. About 19 research trials were conducted in this year Many of it was multi-varietal trials while some were an inorganic trial. Inorganic trials are conducted from the year 2005-2006. This is the identified station for multi-varietal trials.

Notable people
 Baba Amte, a social worker and activist known particularly for his work with people suffering from leprosy, was born in Hinganghat on 24 December 1914.
 William Lambton, a British soldier, surveyor, and geographer, died in Hinganghat on 19 January 1823 while working on the Great Trigonometric Survey.
 Jani Babu, A legendary Indian Sufi and qawwali singer. He was born in 1935 in Hinganghat. He was born Jan Mohammad Jani Babu. He is known for his work on Shankar Shambhu (1976), Mitti (2001) and Market (2003)
 Sunil Pal, the winner of Laughter Challenge-1 comedy show.
 Vaishali Made, winner of Sa Re Ga Ma Pa, an Indian musical reality TV Show.
 Nisha Mohota, an Indian chess player who holds the FIDE titles of International Master (IM) and Woman Grandmaster (WGM). She is the first WGM from the State of West Bengal. She became the then youngest Woman International Master (WIM) in April 1995 at the age of 14 years, 6 months and 13 days on April 26, 1995.  		 
 D.P. Kothari is an educationist and professor who has held leadership positions at engineering institutions in India including IIT Delhi, Visvesvaraya National Institute of Technology, Nagpur and VIT University, Vellore.
 Satyapal Landage (Satyapal), Comedian, Actor & voice over artist , Films star, TV actor ( Maddam sir - SAB TV ) - Badnaam ,  ( Motu - Patlu ) - John , ( Dabangg ) - bachha bhaiya.

References

External links

 

 Cities and towns in Wardha district
 Talukas in Maharashtra
 Cities in Maharashtra